Mohamed Shilmi (born 14 January 1994) is a Sri Lankan cricketer. He made his List A debut for Kalutara District in the 2016–17 Districts One Day Tournament on 22 March 2017. He made his Twenty20 debut on 4 March 2021, for Kalutara Town Club in the 2020–21 SLC Twenty20 Tournament.

References

External links
 

1994 births
Living people
Sri Lankan cricketers
Kalutara District cricketers
Kalutara Town Club cricketers
Panadura Sports Club cricketers
Nugegoda Sports and Welfare Club cricketers
Place of birth missing (living people)